NCAA Season 87 is the 2011–12 season of the National Collegiate Athletic Association (NCAA) of the Philippines. The host school, University of Perpetual Help System DALTA (UPHSD), led the opening ceremonies at the Araneta Coliseum on July 2, 2011. The men's basketball and the women's volleyball tournaments will be aired by ABS-CBN and Studio 23 for the tenth consecutive season, while the men's basketball events will be simulcast on DZRJ-AM.

Preseason
The Lyceum of the Philippines University became the tenth NCAA team after the league accepted Lyceum as a guest team for the 87 season. Management Committee (MANCOM) chair Mike del Mundo announced that Lyceum completed all of the necessary requirements, including the existence of a high school department. The nonexistence of a high school department two years ago prevented Lyceum from being a guest team; its high school campus in Cavite was accepted and the Lyceum Pirates will field in teams in the mandatory sports. Lyceum paid the league 1.5 million pesos to play in the basketball event, and additional P500,000 bond, as they will have to pay additional fees to play in other events. The Pirates, as a guest team, are eligible to win the championship. Del Mundo also announced the elevation of cheerleading as a regular sport.

Due to the number of competing schools, two days were set aside for the eligibility meeting to ensure no eligibility issues this season.

Boxing's eight-division world champion and Sarangani representative Manny Pacquiao was the keynote speaker during the opening ceremonies on July 2.

Basketball

Seniors' tournament

Elimination round

Bracket

Awards
Most Valuable Player: Calvin Abueva, San Sebastian College-Recoletos
Rookie of the Year: Josan Nîmes, Mapua Institute of Technology

Juniors' tournament

Team standings

Bracket

Awards
Most Valuable Player: Rey Nambatac, Colegio de San Juan de Letran
Rookie of the Year: Lugie Cuyos, Emilio Aguinaldo College-Immaculate Concepcion Academy

Volleyball
The volleyball tournaments held its opening ceremonies last November 23 at the Ninoy Aquino Stadium. Selected games are held at San Beda Gym, Lyceum Gym and Letran Gym.

Women's tournament
The game between San Sebastian and UPHSD, held in San Beda Gym, was conceded after a brawl between the basketball team of San Beda and the volleyball team of San Sebastian.

Elimination round

Season host is boldfaced.

Semifinals

Finals

|-
|colspan=10 align=center|UPHSD wins series 2–0
|}

Men's tournament
The game of SSC-R with UPHSD was rescheduled to January 4 after a brawl during the women's match of the same teams in San Beda Gym.

Elimination round

Season host is boldfaced.

Semifinals

Finals

|-
|colspan=10 align=center|UPHSD wins series 2–0
|}

Juniors' tournament

Elimination round

Season host is boldfaced.

Semifinals

Finals

|-
|colspan=10 align=center|Series tied 1–1
|}

Beach Volleyball
The Men's and Women's beach volleyball tournaments started last August 13, 2011 at the La Salle Greenhills sandcourt.

Men's tournament

Elimination round
Season host is boldfaced; guest team is italicized.

Bracket

Awards
 Most Valuable Player: Carlo Lozada, Arellano University

Juniors' tournament

Elimination round
Season host is boldfaced.

Bracket

Awards
 Most Valuable Player: Adrian Jopet Movido, Emilio Aguinaldo College

Women's tournament

Elimination round
Season host is boldfaced; guest team is italicized.

Bracket

Awards
 Most Valuable Player: April Anne Sartin, University of Perpetual Help System DALTA

Chess
The chess tournaments started on July 31, 2011 at SM Centerpoint in Sta. Mesa, Manila.

Seniors Division

Elimination round
Season host is boldfaced.

Juniors' Division

Elimination round
Season host is boldfaced.

Swimming
The swimming tournaments opened last August 19, 2011 at the Rizal Swimming Pool.

Men's tournament

Women's tournament

Juniors' tournament

Season host is boldfaced.

Table Tennis

Men's Division

Elimination round
Season host is boldfaced.

Finals

Women's Division

Elimination round
Season host is boldfaced.

Finals

Juniors Division

Elimination round
Season host is boldfaced.

Finals

Taekwondo

Men's tournament

Women's tournament

Juniors' tournament

General Tally
As of November 3, 2011.

Seniors' Division

Juniors' Division

General Championship race
Season host is boldfaced.

Note: This is as of February 7, 2012.

Juniors' Division

Seniors' Division

See also
UAAP Season 74

References

External links
Official website

2012 in multi-sport events
2011 in Philippine sport
2012 in Philippine sport
87
2011 in multi-sport events